Electric Warrior is the second studio album by English rock band T. Rex, their sixth since their debut as Tyrannosaurus Rex. The album marked a turning point in the band's sound, moving away from the folk-oriented sound of the group's previous albums and pioneering a more flamboyant, pop-friendly glam rock style.

The album reached number one on the UK Albums Chart and became the best selling album of 1971. Specifically the single "Get It On" helped promote the album's success and reached the top ten in the US Billboard Hot 100 singles chart. Retitled "Bang a Gong (Get It On)" by the US record company, it also became the band's only North American hit.

Electric Warrior has since received acclaim as a pivotal release of the glam rock movement. It had a profound influence on later musicians of different genres.

Promotion
Marc Bolan, in a 1971 interview contained on the Rhino Records reissue, said of the album, "I think Electric Warrior, for me, is the first album which is a statement of 1971 for us in England. I mean that's... If anyone ever wanted to know why we were big in the other part of the world, that album says it, for me."

Bolan was a guest on the BBC Television show, Cilla, in January 1973. He and Cilla Black sang an acoustic version of "Life's a Gas".

Artwork
The cover artwork was designed by English art design group Hipgnosis, based on a photo taken by Kieron "Spud" Murphy of Marc Bolan at a T. Rex concert. Murphy also took the photo of the band that was used for the poster that was included with the first issue in the UK and Germany. The inner sleeve artwork, portraits of Marc Bolan and Mickey Finn, was drawn by artist George Underwood.

Release
Electric Warrior was released on 24 September 1971 by record label Fly in the UK and Reprise in the US. It went to number 1 on the UK Albums Chart, staying there at the slot for 8 weeks. The album remained in the UK chart for a total of 44 weeks. It was preceded by the single "Hot Love", a hit single in the UK, where it stayed at number 1 for six weeks. In the US, Electric Warrior reached number 32 in the Billboard 200 chart.

Two singles were released from the album: "Get It On" and "Jeepster". "Get It On" was T. Rex's biggest selling single, and became the band's only top-ten US hit. In the United States, "Get It On"'s title was originally changed to "Bang a Gong (Get It On)" to distinguish it from Chase's song "Get It On", which was also released in late 1971.

Reception

Contemporary reviews

In a positive 1972 review for Rolling Stone, Ben Gerson noted Bolan's transition from his earlier fairytale lyrics, noting that now "his targets are your common rock & roll cliches, as well as your common pseudo-poetic, pseudo-philosophical rock & roll cliches [...] What Marc seems to be saying on Electric Warrior is that rock is ultimately as quaint as wizards and unicorns, and finally, as defunct. Gerson concluded that the album established Bolan as "the heaviest rocker under 5’4″ in the world today." The Village Voice critic Robert Christgau was reserved in his praise: "A freak hit turned [Bolan] into a singer of rhythmic fairy tales for British pre-pubes, exactly what he was always suited for, and the great 'Bang a Gong' extends his subject matter into the rock myth itself, which has its limits but sure beats unicorns. Now if he'd only recycle a few more pop readymades I could stop complaining about fey."

Retrospective reviews
Retrospectively, Electric Warrior has received critical acclaim and is regarded as one of Marc Bolan's best works. Chris Jones of BBC Music called the album a "slice of pop heaven," and stated that "this was the point at which he and long-term producer Tony Visconti took the hippy-dippy lyrics and Larry the lamb vocal stylings and bolted them on to good old stripped-down, four-to-the-floor rock 'n' roll." In his retrospective review, Steve Huey of AllMusic called it "the album that essentially kick-started the U.K. glam rock craze" and wrote that "the real reason Electric Warrior stands the test of time so well – despite its intended disposability – is that it revels so freely in its own absurdity and wilful lack of substance [...] Bolan's lack of pomposity, back-to-basics songwriting, and elaborate theatrics went on to influence everything from hard rock to punk to new wave." Brian James of Pitchfork called it "the first and best of a trio of brilliant albums," stating that "When T.Rex is kicking out the jams, they sound like they're having the most gleeful, absurd good time ever committed to wax," but adding that "the most significant aspect of Electric Warrior isn't its arena rock confidence; it's that Bolan allows his grinning mask to slip [...] On ballads like 'Cosmic Dancer', 'Monolith' and 'Girl', he speaks in the same gibberish as elsewhere, but he's clearly haunted-- by what we can't say."

Accolades
In 1987, Electric Warrior was ranked number 100 in Rolling Stone magazine's "100 Greatest Albums of the Last 20 Years" list. In 2003, the album was ranked number 160 by the same magazine in its list of the 500 greatest albums of all time, maintaining the rating in a 2012 revised list, dropping to number 188 in a 2020 revised list. In 2004, Pitchfork ranked Electric Warrior as the 20th best album of the 1970s. The album was also included in the book 1001 Albums You Must Hear Before You Die.
It was voted number 873 in the third edition of Colin Larkin's All Time Top 1000 Albums (2000).

Legacy
The album is credited as the first glam rock album, pioneering the development of the glam scene.

The Jam's Paul Weller cited it as one of his all-time favourite records, hailing Bolan's guitar playing as "really unique. You know his sound instantly." Lol Tolhurst of the Cure said that they listened to it during their formative years: "We were listening to T.Rex at this time,” [...] “I recall Robert [Smith] had a copy of Electric Warrior". The Slits's guitarist Viv Albertine also mentioned a special liking for this album for "the whole sound, the whole cartoony, sexual, and  thing, it's very English as well. I think Prince has taken so much from Bolan." PJ Harvey's main collaborator John Parish included it in his favourites: "when I'm working... I like to have a few records that are most important for me, which I periodically stick on to remind myself just how good records can be. [...] I have a duty to at least try and make something as sweet and irresistible as this". Morrissey covered "Cosmic Dancer" live in 1991, both solo and for a one-off duet with David Bowie during an encore at a Los Angeles' concert; a version was included as a b-side for "Pregnant for the Last Time". Bobby Gillespie of Primal Scream has cited "Get it On" as one of his all-time favorite pop songs, adding "When I was growing up, singles were an art statement. [...] People like [..] T. Rex were changing all the time. As a fan you wanted to know what they were going to wear and whether you could follow them to that new place". The Pixies recorded a version of "Mambo Sun" for the b-side of one of their singles.

Use in media
"Cosmic Dancer" is featured prominently in the soundtrack of the final segment of the 2019 Netflix documentary Dancing with the Birds, in which a male Carola's parotia successfully woos a female into mating with his courtship display.

Track listing

Personnel

T. Rex 
 Marc Bolan – vocals, guitar
 Mickey Finn – congas, bongos, vocals
 Steve Currie – bass
 Bill Legend – drums, tambourine

Additional personnel 
 Howard Kaylan – backing vocals
 Mark Volman – backing vocals
 Rick Wakeman – keyboards on "Get It On"
 Ian McDonald – saxophone
 Burt Collins – flugelhorn

Technical personnel 
 Tony Visconti – production, string arrangements
 Roy Thomas Baker – engineering
 Martin Rushent – tape operator
 George Underwood – artwork, photography
 George Marino – mastering

Charts

Weekly charts

Year-end charts

Certifications

References

External links
 

T. Rex (band) albums
1971 albums
Albums with cover art by Hipgnosis
Albums produced by Tony Visconti
Albums recorded at Trident Studios
Fly Records albums
Reprise Records albums
Albums recorded at Wally Heider Studios